Oregon's Matterhorns is an informal group of volcanoes in the Cascade Range, in the American state of Oregon, named after the original Matterhorn. The Pacific Crest Trail passes near all of the volcanoes which constitute Oregon's Matterhorns.

Origin of the name
Oregon's Matterhorns gained their name from Stephen Harris' book Fire Mountains of the West. The name was inspired by similarities in form to the original Matterhorn in the Alps between Switzerland and Italy. 

Oregon's Matterhorns should not be confused with the peak in the Wallowa Mountains (sometimes referred to as "The Alps of Oregon") also called Matterhorn.

Mountains included

It is a small set including all of:

 Mount Bailey,
 Diamond Peak,
 Mount Thielsen, The "Lightning Rod of the Cascades",
 Mount Washington and
 Three Fingered Jack

See also

 Deschutes National Forest
 Diamond Lake
 Diamond Peak Wilderness
 List of Oregon Wildernesses
 McKenzie Pass
 Mount Jefferson Wilderness
 Mount Thielsen Wilderness
 Mount Washington Wilderness
 Pacific Crest Trail
 Shield volcano
 Tephra cone
 Willamette National Forest

See also

References

External links and references
 One reference
 Stephen Harris's homepage

Cascade Range
Volcanoes of Oregon
Mountains of Oregon
Cascade Volcanoes